The 1999 Oregon State Beavers football team represented Oregon State University in the Pacific-10 Conference (Pac-10) during the 1999 NCAA Division I-A football season. In their first season under head coach Dennis Erickson, the Beavers compiled a 7–4 regular season record (4–4 in Pac-10, fifth), their first winning season in 29 years. They opened with three non-conference wins, lost the first three conference games, then won four straight, but fell in the Civil War at Oregon.

OSU made their first bowl game appearance in 35 years, but dropped the Oahu Bowl by six points to host Hawaii on Christmas day to finish 

Hired in January, Erickson was previously the head coach of the NFL's Seattle Seahawks for four years, preceded by six seasons at the University of Miami.  Predecessor Mike Riley had left the Beavers after just two seasons for the NFL's San Diego Chargers, then returned to Corvallis in  February 2003.

Schedule

Game summaries

UCLA

    
    
    
    
    
    
    
    
    

Oregon State's biggest margin of victory in three years (67–28 over Northern Illinois), and their highest point total to date against a Pac-10 opponent.

Roster

References

Oregon State
Oregon State Beavers football seasons
Oregon State Beavers football